Iverson Creek Volcano is an eroded volcanic outcrop in northwestern British Columbia, Canada. It is one of the volcanoes of the Northern Cordilleran Volcanic Province and last erupted in the Pleistocene period.

See also
List of volcanoes in Canada
List of Northern Cordilleran volcanoes
Volcanism of Canada
Volcanism of Western Canada

References

Volcanoes of British Columbia
Northern Cordilleran Volcanic Province
Pleistocene volcanoes
Pleistocene North America
Quaternary British Columbia